The Japanese School of Dallas (ダラス補習授業校 Darasu Hoshū Jugyō Kō) is a part-time Japanese educational program for Japanese citizens and Japanese Americans located in the Dallas-Fort Worth metroplex. The school office in Dallas, and it conducts its classes at Ted Polk Middle School in Carrollton. As of 2015 Munetake Yamamura (山村 宗武 Yamamura Munetake) is the principal.

History

The Dallas Japanese Association (ダラス日本人会 Darasu Nihonjinkai) established the school in 1989. It previously had the English name Japanese Language Advancement School of Dallas, and classes were formerly held at Dan F. Long Middle School in Dallas.

On Monday, July 25, 2016, the Japanese Association and the Japanese School offices moved to its current location in Dallas. The classroom location remained the same. Previously the school office was in Farmers Branch.

Student demographics
As of 2014 the Japanese school had 400 students, most of whom are Japanese citizens who are children of company employees temporarily stationed in the U.S., and some of whom are Japanese Americans retaining their Japanese culture. That year school administration expected an additional 150 students to enroll over the subsequent two-year period due to Toyota Motor Sales, U.S.A., Inc. moving its headquarters to Plano.

References

 梶田 正巳 and 杉村 伸一郎 (Kobe Women's University 文学部). "<原著>ダラス日本語補習授業校の子どもたち" (Archive). Bulletin of the School of Education (名古屋大學教育學部紀要): Psychology (心理学) 46, 32–39, 1999-12-27. Nagoya University. See profile at CiNii. See profile at Nagoya University Repository (名古屋大学学術機関リポジトリ). Alternate location (Archive).

.

Notes

External links
  Japanese School of Dallas
 Dallas Japanese Association

 

Asian-American culture in the Dallas–Fort Worth metroplex
Schools in Dallas County, Texas
Education in Carrollton, Texas
Education in Dallas
Japanese-American culture in Texas
Educational institutions established in 1989
1989 establishments in Texas
Dallas